Digitus IV or fourth digit can refer to:
 Ring finger (digitus IV manus)
 Fourth toe (digitus IV pedis)